KRS may refer to:

 Kadet Remaja Sekolah, a youth organisation in Malaysia
 Kentucky Revised Statutes, US
 Kinross-shire, historic county in Scotland, Chapman code
 National Council of the Judiciary (Poland) (Krajowa Rada Sądownictwa), a Polish constitutional organ nominating judges
 Krishna Raja Sagara, a lake and dam, India
 Kristiansand Airport, Kjevik, IATA airport code
 KRS-One (b. 1965), Lawrence Krisna Parker, US hip-hop musician
 KRS Film Distributors (Malta)
 HC Kunlun Red Star, Chinese hockey club